Kai Pahlman (8 July 1935 – 8 March 2013) was a Finnish association football forward and coach. Between 1954 and 1968 he capped 56 times for the Finland national football team, scoring 13 goals. At club level Pahlman played for HPS, HJK and Reipas. Pahlman invented the curl ball, that he called The Banana Shot. Pahlman was the son of Finnish musician Helge Pahlman and an accomplished piano player and composer. He appeared as a piano player in the 1961 musical film Tähtisumua and composed music for several short documentaries in 1973.

Honours
Finnish Championship: 1957, 1970, 1973 (as a coach)
Mestaruussarja Top Scorer: 1958, 1961, 1965
Finnish Cup: 1962, 1966
Finnish Footballer of the Year: 1958

References

External links

1935 births
Footballers from Helsinki
Finnish footballers
Finnish film score composers
Male film score composers
Finnish male film actors
Finnish football managers
Finland international footballers
Helsingin Jalkapalloklubi managers
2013 deaths
Mestaruussarja players
Association football forwards
Reipas Lahti players